The Florence Division is a railroad division operated by CSX Transportation in the U.S. states of Georgia, Kentucky, North Carolina, South Carolina, Tennessee, Virginia & West Virginia. The Florence Division has 60 Subdivisions. The Subdivisions in italics came from the Huntington East & Huntington West Divisions effective June 20, 2016.

The Subdivisions within the Florence Division are as follows:
 Aberdeen Subdivision
 Alleghany Subdivision
 Andrews Subdivision
 Augusta Subdivision
 Bellwood Subdivision
 Belton Subdivision
 Big Coal Subdivision
 Big Marsh Fork Subdivision
 Blue Ridge Subdivision
 Buffalo Subdivision
 Cabin Creek Subdivision
 Charleston Subdivision
 Charlotte Subdivision
 CN&L Subdivision
 Coal River Subdivision
 Columbia Subdivision
 Creston Subdivision
 Cross Subdivision
 Eastover Subdivision
 G&E Subdivision
 Gauley Subdivision
 Georgetown Subdivision
 Hamlet Subdivision
 Hamlet Terminal Subdivision
 Hopewell Subdivision
 Island Creek Subdivision
 James River Subdivision
 Jarrolds Valley Subdivision
 Kanawha Subdivision
 Kingsport Subdivision
 Lane Subdivision
 Laurel Fork Subdivision
 Logan Subdivision
 Logan and Southern Subdivision
 McCormick Subdivision
 Middle Creek Subdivision
 Monroe Subdivision
 New River Subdivision
 Norlina Subdivision
 North End Subdivision
 Orangeburg Subdivision
 Parmele Subdivision
 Peninsula Subdivision
 Pine Creek Subdivision
 Piney Creek Subdivision
 Pond Fork Subdivision
 Portsmouth Subdivision
 Raleigh Southwestern and Winding Gulf Subdivision
 Richmond Terminal Subdivision
 Rivanna Subdivision
 Rupert Subdivision
 Seth Subdivision
 Sewell Valley Subdivision
 South End Subdivision
 Spartanburg Subdivision
 Tarboro Subdivision
 Terrell Subdivision
 W&W Subdivision
 West Fork Subdivision
 Wilmington Subdivision

See also
 List of CSX Transportation lines

References

CSX Transportation lines